Ruslan Aslanovich Abazov (born 25 May 1993) is a Russian former professional football player. He played as a right back.

Career

Spartak Nalchik
He made his Russian Premier League debut for PFC Spartak Nalchik on 27 April 2012 in a game against FC Krylia Sovetov Samara.

Rostov
In June 2014, FC Rostov announced sighing Abazov on a four-year deal.

Honours

Club
Tosno
 Russian Cup: 2017–18

References

External links
 
 

1993 births
People from Urvansky District
Sportspeople from Kabardino-Balkaria
Living people
Russian people of Abkhazian descent
Russian footballers
Russia youth international footballers
Association football defenders
PFC Spartak Nalchik players
FC Rostov players
FC Tyumen players
FC Fakel Voronezh players
FC Tosno players
FC Rotor Volgograd players
FC Nizhny Novgorod (2015) players
Russian Premier League players
Russian First League players